The 1993–94 Santosh Trophy was the 50th edition of the Santosh Trophy, the main State competition for football in India. It was held in Orissa with the final in Cuttack.

Bengal defeated Kerala 5-3 penalties in the final. It was the 24th title for Bengal. For Kerala who were the defending champions, it was their seventh consecutive final.

For sponsorship reasons, the tournament was titled Bharat Petroleum Golden Jubilee National Football Championship for the Santosh Trophy. Bharat Petroleum sponsored Santosh Trophy for six seasons till 1999.

Semifinal

Final

References

External links 

Santosh Trophy seasons
1993–94 in Indian football